Dołżyca may refer to two villages in the Subcarpathian Voivodeship (province) of south-eastern Poland:

Dołżyca, Lesko County, a village in the administrative district of Gmina Cisna, within Lesko County.
Dołżyca, Sanok County, a village in the administrative district of Gmina Komańcza, within Sanok County.